The 2020 season for Movistar cycling team began in January at the Tour Down Under.

Team roster

Riders who joined the team for the 2020 season

Riders who left the team during or after the 2019 season

Season victories

National, Continental and World champions

Footnotes

References

External links
 

2020 road cycling season by team
2020 in Spanish road cycling
Movistar Team (men's team)